Neoluederitzia is a genus of flowering plants in the caltrop family, Zygophyllaceae. The sole species is Neoluederitzia sericocarpa. It is endemic to Namibia.  Its natural habitat is intermittent freshwater marshes. It is unusual within the family for being dioecious: having male and female flowers on separate plants.

References

Monotypic rosid genera
Tribuloideae
Flora of Namibia
Least concern plants
Taxonomy articles created by Polbot
Dioecious plants
Taxobox binomials not recognized by IUCN